Chidambaranatha Soorappa Chozhanar (died 2013) was the last anointed Zamindar of Pichavaram.

Early life 
He came from the family of Picharvaram Zamin living in Chidambaram. He earned an MA in Political Science.

Heritage 
The Chola safeguarded the key of the Nataraja temple, about one hundred years ago. During that time, the Dikshitars collected the key of the temple from the Zamin family every morning and received it from them at night. Chozhanar was anointed in 1978 at Nataraja temple in Chidambaram.This dynasty has the sole ownership of Chidambaram Natarajar Temple though the management of the temple had been taken over by 3000 dekshidars of Natarajar Temple against them since the key was given to the Head dekshidar who started acting autonomously against the Chola King Chozhanar.

Personal life 
He married Santhi Devi, of Udayarpalayam Zamin with whom he had two sons, Chakravarthi, Mannarmannan and one daughter Ishwarya. He died at age 63 on 10 December 2013. The last rites were held at Chellappanpettai near Panthanallur in Thanjavur district. He was into agriculture.

References 

1950 births
2013 deaths
Chola dynasty
Indian farmers
Indian monarchs